Karen Pirie is a British crime drama television series based on Inspector Karen Pirie series of novels by Val McDermid. The first series began on ITV on 25 September 2022 and concluded on 9 October 2022. On 21 February 2023, it was announced the series had been commissioned for a second series.

Plot 
Karen Pirie, a young detective-sergeant, is in charge of reopening the cold case for the murder of a barmaid. Series 1 is based on the first novel The Distant Echo.

Cast 
Lauren Lyle as DS Karen Pirie
Chris Jenks as DC Jason Murray
Zach Wyatt as Phil Parhatka
Jhon Lumsden as Ziggy Jnr
Jack Hesketh a Weird Jnr
Buom Tihngang as Alex Jnr
Alec Newman as Ziggy Snr
Michael Sheffer as Weird Snr
Ariyon Bakare as Alex Snr
Bobby Rainsbury as Grace Galloway
Anna Russell-Martin as Rosie Duff
Gilly Gilchrist as DI Barney MacLennan
Kevin Mains as DI Jimmy Lawson Jnr
Stuart Bowman as Chief Supt Lawson Snr
Gemma McElhinney as PC Janice Hogg
Emer Kenny as River Wilde
Rakhee Thakrar as Bel Richmond
Steve John Shepherd as DI Simon Lees

Production 
In May 2021, it was announced that Lauren Lyle would star as the title character.

Emer Kenny wrote the adaptation and the producers are the same as for the series Line of duty or Bodyguard. The creative team is unusually young.

Series One was written by Emer Kenny and directed by Gareth Bryn.

Reception 
On Rotten Tomatoes, the series has an approval rating of 91% based on 11 reviews, with an average rating of 8.6/10. The site's critical consensus reads, "Clever and twisty, Karen Pirie refreshingly revamps the traditional grizzled detective procedural by putting a young woman on the case." Series One averaged 4.82 million viewers.

Awards  
For writing the first episode, Emer Kenny was nominated for the Edgar Allan Poe Award for Best Episode in a TV Series.

See also 

 Wire in the Blood

References

External links

2022 British television series debuts
2020s British crime drama television series
2020s British workplace drama television series
British detective television series
British thriller television series
English-language television shows
Television series by World Productions
Television series by ITV Studios
Television shows filmed in Scotland
ITV crime dramas